Joseph Adolphe Théophile Olivier (2 December 1874 in Paris – 21 May 1901 in Neuilly-sur-Seine) was a French rugby union player who competed in the 1900 Summer Olympics. He was a member of the French rugby union team, which won the gold medal.

References

External links

Joseph Oliver's profile at databaseOlympics

1874 births
1901 deaths
Rugby union players from Paris
French rugby union players
Rugby union players at the 1900 Summer Olympics
Olympic rugby union players of France
Olympic gold medalists for France
Medalists at the 1900 Summer Olympics